Kurt Leonel da Rocha Couto (born 14 May 1985 in Maputo) is an athlete from Mozambique who specializes in 400 metres hurdles.

Life
At the age of 17, he moved to South Africa to train.

His personal best in the 400 metres is 46.50 (Windhoek, 2007) and 49.02 in the 400 metres hurdles (Prague 2012).

He was flag bearer for his country at the Olympics three times (2004 Summer, 2008 Summer and 2012 Summer).  He was also Mozambique's flag-bearer at the 2014 Commonwealth Games.
At the 2016 Olympic Games, Couto retired after the first round, with a time of 49.74 seconds.

Competition record

References

External links

IAAF

Mozambican male hurdlers
Olympic athletes of Mozambique
Athletes (track and field) at the 2004 Summer Olympics
Athletes (track and field) at the 2012 Summer Olympics
Athletes (track and field) at the 2016 Summer Olympics
Sportspeople from Maputo
1985 births
Living people
Athletes (track and field) at the 2006 Commonwealth Games
Athletes (track and field) at the 2010 Commonwealth Games
Athletes (track and field) at the 2014 Commonwealth Games
Athletes (track and field) at the 2018 Commonwealth Games
Athletes (track and field) at the 2015 African Games
Commonwealth Games competitors for Mozambique
World Athletics Championships athletes for Mozambique
African Games silver medalists for Mozambique
African Games medalists in athletics (track and field)
Universiade medalists in athletics (track and field)
Universiade medalists for Mozambique
Medalists at the 2007 Summer Universiade
Medalists at the 2011 Summer Universiade
Islamic Solidarity Games medalists in athletics